Jerez de la Frontera, or simply Jerez, is a Spanish city and municipality in the province of Cádiz in the autonomous community of Andalusia, in southwestern Spain, located midway between the Atlantic Ocean and the Cádiz Mountains. , the city, the largest in the province, had a population of 213,105. It is the fifth largest in Andalusia, and has become the transportation and communications hub of the province, surpassing even Cádiz, the provincial capital, in economic activity. Jerez de la Frontera is also, in terms of land area, the largest municipality in the province, and its sprawling outlying areas are a fertile zone for agriculture. There are also many cattle ranches and horse-breeding operations, as well as a world-renowned wine industry (Xerez).

Currently, Jerez, with 213,105 inhabitants, is the 25th largest city in Spain, the 5th in Andalusia and 1st in the Province of Cádiz. It belongs to the Municipal Association of the Bay of Cádiz (Mancomunidad de Municipios Bahía de Cádiz), the 3rd largest Andalusian metropolitan area and the 12th in Spain, with over 650,000 inhabitants.

Some famous places in the city are Alcazar of Jerez, Church of San Miguel, Charterhouse of Jerez, the Cathedral of San Salvador.

Since 1987 the Grand Prix motorcycle racing has been held at the Circuito de Jerez in early May. On this weekend, the city welcomes tens of thousands of bikers from around the world. The same circuit has hosted several Formula 1 Grands Prix, including the 1997 final race of the season, which was marred with controversy for a notable high-profile championship-deciding incident. Other popular festivals in the city are Feria de Jerez or the Holy Week in Jerez.

Etymology

The name Jerez goes back to the Phoenician Xera, Sèrès, later Romanized under the name of Ceret; the location of this settlement, however, remains unknown.

The current Spanish name came by way of the Arabic name  Sherīsh.  In former times, during the Muslim period in Iberia, it was called Xerez or Xerés (pronounced  in Old Spanish). The name of the famous fortified wine, sherry, which originated here (although some argue that it originated in Shiraz, Persia), represents an adaptation of the city's Arabic name, Sherish. Frontera refers to a Spanish frontier, located on the border between the Moorish and Christian regions of Spain during the 13th century, a regular host to skirmishes and clashes between the two regions.  Over two centuries later, after the Castilian conquest of Granada in 1492, Xerez definitively lost its status as a frontier city, but did not lose that designation.

After the Kingdom of Castile took Jerez on October 9, 1264, following the name given by the Muslims to the city in the period known as the Reconquista, the city was then called Xerez in medieval Castilian, transcribing the consonant  (like the English sh) with the letter , as was the rule at the time. Thus the name was pronounced "Sheres", similar to the Moorish Arabic "Sherish".  In the 16th century, the consonant  changed into the consonant , with the corresponding spelling of Jerez.

The old spelling "Xerez" as the name given to the city survived in several foreign languages until very recently, and today continues to influence the name given to sherry: Portuguese Xerez , Catalan Xerès , English sherry , French Xérès . The city's main football team continues to use the old spelling, Xerez.

History

Prehistory and Ancient history
Traces of human presence in the area date from the upper Neolithic, and humans have inhabited Jerez de la Frontera since at least the Copper or Neolithic Age, but the identity of the first natives remains unclear.  The first major protohistoric settlement in the area (around the third millennium BC) is attributed to the Tartessians. Jerez later became a Roman city under the name of Asta Regia (located 8 km further north at Cortijo el Rosario).

Middle Ages
After the fall of the Western Roman Empire, the Vandals and the Visigoths ruled it until the Arabs conquered the area in 711. In the 11th century it briefly became the seat of an independent taifa. Some years later 'Abdun ibn Muhammad united it with Arcos and ruled both (ca. 1040–1053). In 1053 it was annexed to Seville. From 1145 to 1147 the region of Arcos and Jerez briefly operated as an emirate under dependency of Granada, led by Abu'l-Qasim Ahyal. Later the Almohads conquered the city. In the 12th and 13th centuries Jerez underwent a period of great development, building its defense system and setting the current street layout of the old town.

In 1231 the Battle of Jerez took place within the town's vicinity: Christian troops under the command of Álvaro Pérez de Castro, lord of the House of Castro and grandson of Alfonso VII, king of Castile and León, defeated the troops of the Emir Ibn Hud, despite the numerical superiority of the latter. After a month-long siege in 1261, the city surrendered to Castile, but its Muslim population remained. It rebelled and was finally defeated in 1264.

Thanks to its agriculture-based economy, rich countryside and bustling demographics, Jerez was already a major city of the Lower Andalusia towards the end of the Middle Ages.

Early modern period

The discovery of the Americas and the conquest of Granada, in 1492, made Jerez one of the most prosperous cities of Andalusia through trade and through its proximity to the ports of Seville and Cádiz. Attracted by the economic possibilities offered by the winemaking business, a substantial foreign European population (English, Flemish, Portuguese and, most notably, Genoese) installed in the city. Together with the local wealthy class, they participated in slave ownership.

Despite the social, economic and political decadence that occurred in the seventeenth century, towards the end of the Habsburg rule, the city managed to maintain a reasonable pace of development, becoming world-famous for its wine industry.

Late modern period

Government

Municipal government

The city of Jerez is governed by the ayuntamiento (municipality) of Jerez, whose representatives, as in other towns in Spain, are elected every four years by universal suffrage for all citizens older than 18 years of age. The body is chaired by the mayor of Jerez.

Currently, the mayor is María del Carmen Sánchez Díaz, known as Mamen Sánchez, member of Spanish Socialist Workers' Party, who won the municipal election in 2015, by the aid of Ganemos Jerez and IULV-CA.

Mayors

List of mayors of Jerez since the early twentieth century to the present:

Economy

The economy of Jerez has traditionally been centred on the wine industry, with exports of sherry worldwide. Because it lacks the civil service that other cities enjoy, Jerez has based its economy on industry. The cultivation of fruits, grains, and vegetables and horse and cattle husbandry has also been important to the local economy.  It is the home base for the Spanish Military Stud farm, the Yeguada Militar de Jerez de la Frontera.

After the wine crisis in the 1990s, the city is now seeking to expand its industrial base. Tourism has been successfully promoted. The city's strong identity as a center for wine, flamenco, and horses, its popular festivals, MotoGP hosting and its historical heritage have contributed to this success.

The city is the home of Jerez Airport and has also been positioning itself as a logistics hub for western Andalusia, through the integration between the airport, the rail system and nearby ports.

Geography

Location 

Jerez de la Frontera is located in the region of Campiña de Jerez, which includes the municipalities of Jerez de la Frontera and San José del Valle. The territory of the region corresponds to the previous municipality of the city of Jerez, before the disintegration of San José del Valle in 1995. The municipality of Jerez is the largest in the province of Cadiz and the sixth in Spain with 1188 square kilometers, which would mean twice the island of Ibiza or half of the province of Guipúzcoa.

The region of the Campiña de Jerez is crossed by the Guadalete River. In addition, there are several wetlands in its territory, such as the lagoons of Medina and Torrox. There are also the Montes de Propio de Jerez, included in the Natural Park of Los Alcornocales. Its agriculture is famous worldwide for the designation of origin of its wine, sherry, grown in the triangle formed between Jerez de la Frontera, Sanlúcar de Barrameda and El Puerto de Santa María.

The city is one of the six municipalities that make up the Metropolitan Area of the Bay of Cadiz-Jerez, a polynuclear urban agglomeration formed by the municipalities of Cadiz, Chiclana de la Frontera, Jerez de la Frontera, Puerto Real, El Puerto de Santa Maria and San Fernando located in the Bay of Cadiz.

Climate 
Jerez de la Frontera and the rest of the Cádiz metropolitan area have a Subtropical–Mediterranean climate. For its situation being inland (specially the airport which is further inland than the city), the Atlantic influences are small. Jerez is characterized by mild, short winters with occasional cool nights and hot, long summers with occasional very hot temperatures; unlike the surrounding coastal areas which are characterized by very mild winters and long warm summers. Most of the rain falls from October to January, while the summers are very dry but not rainless. For its situation being inland, the daytime temperatures are higher than in the coast and the lows are cooler, with a difference of at least 10 °C between the highs and the low temperatures of each month. The city averages 53 rainy days, 137 clear days and 2,965 hours of sunshine a year. Snow is extremely rare, and it is even more infrequent than in most of the southern European islands. The last snowfall recorded in the city happened on February 2, 1954. Since then, no snowfall has been recorded.

Main sights

Religious sites

 The Cathedral
 Church of San Miguel (15th century), in Gothic–Baroque style
 Church of San Mateo, in Gothic style, the oldest in the city
 The Charterhouse
 Church of Santiago, dating to the time of Alfonso X of Castile (reigned 1252–1284)
 Church of San Juan de los Caballeros, created after Alfonso X's conquest of the city in 1264
 Church of San Marcos (13th century)
 Church of San Dionisio (13th century), built around 1457
 Church of San Lucas, built over an old mosque
 Church of San Francisco, containing the grave of Queen Blanca de Borbón (died 1361)
 Church of San Pedro
 Chapel of San Juan de Letrán
 Calvary Chapel
 Chapel of Los Desamparados
 Convent of San José
 Convent of Santa María de Gracia
 Convento of Espíritu Santo
 Hermitage of San Isidro Labrador
 Hermitage of San Telmo
 Church of Santo Domingo
 Church of Los Descalzos
 Convent of Las Reparadoras
 Church of La Victoria
 Hermitage of La Ina
 Basílica del Carmen de Jerez

Palaces and manors

 Casa-palacio de la calle Lealas, número 20
 Casa-palacio de los Ponce de León
 Casa de los Basurto
 Casa Petra de la Riva
 Palace of Marqués de Montana
 Palacio Dávila
 Palacio de Bertemati
 Palacio de Campo Real
 Palacio de Riquelme
 Palacio de los Condes de Montegil
 Palacio de los Condes de Puerto Hermoso
 Palacio de los Morla y Melgarejo
 Palacio de Luna
 Palacio de Mirabal
 Palacio de Villapanés
 Palacio de Villavicencio
 Palacio del Barón de Algar del Campo
 Palacio del Conde de los Andes
 Palacio del Marqués de Villamarta
 Palacio Duque de Abrantes
 Palacio Pemartín
 Palacio San Blas

Museums

 Archaeological Museum
 Bullfighting Museum
 Nativity scene Museum
 Museos de la Atalaya
 Pinacoteca Rivero
 Museo del Traje Andaluz
 Museo de Tecnología Agraria Antonio Cabral
 Museo del Enganche

Other monuments

 Old City Hall of Jerez de la Frontera, built in 1575
 Alcazar of Jerez de la Frontera, a Moorish fortress, dating to the 11th century
 Zoo and Botanical Garden of Jerez.
 Villamarta Theatre
 Gallo Azul, built in 1927
 Walls of Jerez de la Frontera

Main factories
 González Byass
 Domecq
 Grupo Estévez
 Grupo Garvey
 Williams & Humbert
 Bodegas de Pilar Plá 
 Bodegas Tradición
 Sánchez Romate
 Bodegas Lustau

Other infrastructure

 Crocodile Farm Kariba, unique in Spain.
 Circuit of Jerez
 Jerez Airport
 Fair Institution of Cádiz
 Chapín Stadium
 Walk of Fame Jerez de la Frontera
 Military Stud of de Jerez de la Frontera
 Jerez Bullring
 Roundabout of Minotaur
 Playground "Children's City"
 Water Tower of Jerez
 Old fish market
 Sala Compañía
 Centro Andaluz de Flamenco 
 Zoco de Artesanía de Jerez
 Children's Traffic Park

Culture

Wine

Jerez has a reputation as the world capital of sherry wine. Sherry is a fortified wine made from white grapes grown near the town of Jerez. Jerez has been a centre of viniculture since the Phoenicians introduced winemaking to Spain in 1100 BC. The Romans continued the practice after they took control of Iberia around 200 BC. The Moors conquered the region in AD 711 and introduced distillation, which led to the development of brandy and fortified wine. Sherry became very popular in Great Britain. Because sherry was a major wine export to the United Kingdom, many English companies and styles developed. British families founded many of the Jerez cellars.

The city has many bodegas (wineries), many of which are of British origin. The most important include:

 González Byass: González Byass is one of Spain's most well-known sherry bodegas. Manuel María González Angel founded it in 1835, and his English agent, Robert Blake Byass subsequently joined in. The firm produces the fino sherry Tío Pepe. According to the Guinness World Records, the world's largest weather vane is located in Gonzalez Byass winery in Jerez, Spain.
 Williams & Humbert: This is a winery located in Jerez de la Frontera dedicated to the production of sherry wines and brandies and other liqueurs. Sir Alexander Williams and Arthur Humbert founded it in 1877.
 Grupo Garvey: William Garvey Power founded Grupo Garvey in 1780.  it is considered one of the most important companies for wine, brandy and liqueurs.
 Grupo Estévez: Estevez Group owns the prestigious wineries Marqués del Real Tesoro and Valdespino, one of the oldest in the area (with origins dating from 1430).
 Domecq: Domecq is a winemaking company founded by Álvaro Domecq Díez's father. It is located in Jerez de la Frontera.

Brandy de Jerez is a brandy produced only in the Jerez area of Andalusia, Spain (exclusively produced within the "Sherry Triangle", the municipal boundaries of Jerez de la Frontera, El Puerto de Santa María and Sanlúcar de Barrameda, in the province of Cádiz).

"Enoturism" is a quite new kind of tourism that looks for places where wines and distilled beverages are produced. Recently the Route of Sherry Wine and Brandy de Jerez has been established.

Brandy de Jerez is being used in Spanish cuisine in recent years, especially with meats.

Carthusian breed of horses

Jerez is the original home of the Carthusian sub-strain of the Andalusian horse breed, known as the Caballo cartujano in Spain. In the latter 1400s, the Carthusian monks began breeding horses on lands donated by Álvaro Obertos de Valeto for construction of the Charterhouse of Jerez de la Frontera (la Cartuja de Jerez de la Frontera). When the Spanish Crown decreed that Spanish horse breeders should breed their Andalusian stock with Neapolitan and central European stock, the monks refused to comply, and continued to select their best specimens to develop their own jealously guarded bloodline for almost four hundred years.

Jerez is the home of the Royal Andalusian School of Equestrian Art, a riding school comparable to the famous Spanish Riding School of Vienna.

Another famous equine institution headquartered in Jerez is the Yeguada Militar de Jerez de la Frontera (known outside Spain as the Yeguada Militar), the Spanish military stud farm dedicated to the breeding of purebred Andalusian and Arabian horses. Founded in 1847, it became the official stud farm of the Spanish military in 1893.

The 2002 FEI World Equestrian Games were held in Jerez at the Estadio Municipal de Chapín, which was remodeled for the event, from September 10 to September 22, 2002. This was the 4th edition of the games, which are held every four years and run by the FEI.

Flamenco

Jerez, the city where flamenco singing began, is also proud of its Andalusian Centre of Flamenco. It was founded in 1993 to safeguard and promote the values and standards of flamenco. It is devoted to the investigation, recovery, and collection of flamenco-related historical documents, whether they are in audio, visual, or journalistic form. It also has a collection of flamenco artifacts, including musical instruments, costumes, promotional posters, sheet music, and postcards. The centre operates a museum and library to help educate the public and serve as a resource for scholars. Its origins date back to the 18th century and it is currently considered an intangible cultural heritage by UNESCO. Many of the most famous personalities of the city are involved in the performance of flamenco, including La Paquera de Jerez, Lola Flores and José Mercé.

Festivals

Since 1987 the Grand Prix motorcycle racing has been held at the Circuito de Jerez in early May. Thousands of motorbikers from around the world come to the city this week to watch the MotoGP race held in Jerez annually. The race is one of the most watched races in Europe.

Another popular festival is the Feria del Caballo (declared a festival of international tourist interest), one of the most famous Spanish fairs, and the most important fair in the province of Cádiz. It is celebrated annually in the Parque González Hontoria for one week in May, occurring always after the Spanish motorcycle Grand Prix. The a fair dedicated mainly to the horse. All booths (casetas) at the fair are open to the public, so that attendees may walk into any one of them and enjoy the food, drinks, and dancing. This is one of the main features that differentiates the Feria de Jerez from the rest of the Andalusian Fairs, such as the Seville Fair, where most of the casetas are private and only card-holding members are allowed in.

Holy Week in Jerez, as in other cities in Andalusia, commemorates the Passion of Jesus Christ. It is celebrated by Catholic religious brotherhoods and fraternities that perform penance processions on the streets during the last week of Lent, the week immediately before Easter. The Holy Week of Jerez de la Frontera stands out for being one of the most important in Andalusia in terms of number of brotherhoods, quality in its carvings and iconographic sets. Holy Week in Jerez was declared of National Tourist Interest in 1993.

During the Christmas season, from the end of November to the end of December, many peñas (religious and cultural clubs) celebrate the holidays with public festivals where anyone can go to drink, eat, dance and sing Christmas carols, accompanied by friction drums called zambombas.

There are also:

Flamenco festival de Jerez
Carnival of Jerez
Fiestas de la Vendimia (Declared a festival of international tourist interest)

Other institutions

The old quarter of Jerez, dating from medieval times, has been named an "Artistic Historic Complex".  The Easter week celebrations in Jerez are of "National Touristic Interest", and its remarkable Feria del Caballo in May is an event of "International Touristic Interest".

The Andalusian Flamenco Centre is located in the Pemartín Palace (Palacio de Pemartín) and offers a library, displays, video films and live demonstrations of the art of flamenco dancing.

Sport

Circuito de Jerez

The city of Jerez is the first motorcycling world capital. It is the site of Circuito de Jerez, formerly called the Circuito Permanente de Jerez, where the annual MotoGP Motorcycle Grand Prix is contested.

The race course is also a prime destination for Formula One teams wishing to perform off-season testing. In the past it has hosted the F1 race itself, namely the Spanish Grand Prix between 1986 and 1990, before the race moved permanently to the Catalunya Circuit near Barcelona. Since then Jerez has hosted Formula One races a few times, with the designation of the European Grand Prix in 1994 and the controversial race in 1997.

Complejo Municipal de Chapín

The Complejo Municipal de Chapín is a complex of sports facilities that includes a football stadium and field, a baseball field, equestrian facilities and a Sports Hall, as well as a futsal field and basketball and volleyball courts.

The Estadio Municipal de Chapín, a multi-purpose stadium, was built in 1988 and seats 20,523 spectators. In 2002 the stadium was remodeled to hold the 2002 FEI World Equestrian Games. The whole grandstand was covered with a roof, and a hotel and spa-gym were added. It was historically the home of Xerez CD, the city's club founded in 1947 and known simply as Xerez, which played in the top division in the 2009–2010 season. Currently, the stadium is the home of Xerez Deportivo FC, founded in 2013 to replace the old Xerez club.

The stadium, which has a running track, was designated as an Olympic Stadium. The most important track team training there is the Club Atletismo Xerez Deportivo FC, which won the Spanish championships in 2001–2007.

Canasta Unibasket Jerez and DKV Jerez are the city's basketball teams; they play in Palacio Municipal de Deportes de Chapín.

Venenciadores de Jerez, the city's baseball team, is currently without a home field and awaits completion of one in the Complejo Municipal de Chapín.

The main futsal team in Jerez is Xerez Deportivo FC (also known as Xerez Toyota Nimauto for sponsorship reasons). It was founded in 2014 and currently plays in the Ruiz Mateos Sports Center and the Palacio Municipal de Deportes de Chapín in Segunda Andaluza.

The most important rugby club is Club Rugby Xerez, which trains at the Pradera Hípica in Chapín.

Domecq Stadium
The Domecq Stadium was the first football stadium in Jerez de la Frontera. It was the home of Xerez CD and Jerez Industrial CF before its demolition. The Stadium del Parque (Park Stadium) was built in 1923 and remodeled (with the name of Domecq Stadium) in 1932 by the architect Francisco Hernández Rubio. It held 20,523 and it was demolished in 1988.

Juventud Stadium 

Currently, the Juventud Stadium is the oldest stadium in the city. It holds 5,000 and is the home of Jerez Industrial CF, founded in 1951, the main rival of Xerez.

Formerly, the football field belonged to the youth hostel which is located in the vicinity thereof, hence its name.

Antonio Fernández Marchán Stadium
It is the CD Guadalcacín stadium, which plays in the Tercera Division. It is placed in Guadalcacín, a neighborhood northern Jerez.

Other sports complexes

 Complejo Deportivo de La Granja
 Campo de fútbol de La Canaleja
 Campo de Fútbol Manuel Millán
 Campo de fútbol Juan Fernández Simón
 Campo de fútbol de Picadueña
 Polideportivo Ruiz-Mateos

Other sports
The 2014 Vuelta a España cycle race began in Jerez de la Frontera on 23 August, with a  team time trial. The race followed a 21-stage route, finishing in Santiago de Compostela on 14 September.

Club Natación Jerez, is the main Swimming Club in Jerez. It has won the "Campeonato de España Master" ("Championship of Spain Master") many times.

Education
There are 76 elementary schools, 41 secondary schools, 12 adult education centres and 10 public libraries in the city of Jerez.

University of Cádiz
The University of Cádiz, the provincial university, has a campus in Jerez. It specializes in socio-political studies.

The city is also home to a member of the Official School of Languages (Escuela Oficial de Idiomas) and a centre of the National Distance Education University (Universidad Nacional de Educación a Distancia, UNED).

Transportation

Airport
El Aeropuerto de Jerez, also known as Aeropuerto de La Parra, is the main airport in the province of Cádiz.

It was built in 1937, during the Spanish Civil War by the Nationalists in order to transport soldiers from Africa to Spain. The airport was open to civil traffic in 1992. It is the third most important airport in Andalucia after Malaga and Seville.

Train

Jerez has had a railway line since 1854, which was one of the first in Spain, the Alcázar de San Juan–Cádiz railway. The line went between Jerez and El Puerto de Santa María and transported wine barrels for export. Jerez de la Frontera railway station is used by more passengers than Cádiz and is the fourth busiest in Andalucia.

Next to the Aeropuerto de Jerez, there is a new train station which connects the airport through the Cercanías Cádiz line C-1 to nearby Jerez, and also to Cádiz, Sevilla, Lebrija, Utrera, El Puerto de Santa María, and San Fernando.

Bus
The city of Jerez has 16 bus lines:

 L 1 Esteve-San Telmo-Constitución
 L 2 Esteve-Picadueñas
 L 3 Esteve-La Plata-Mosto-San Juan de Dios
 L 4 Esteve-García Lorca-El Altillo
 L 5 Esteve-Campus-Guadalcacín
 L 6 Esteve-Campus-La Granja
 L 7 Angustias-La Pita-Estella del Marqués
 L 8 Circunvalación I
 L 9 Circunvalación II
 L 10 Canaleja-Atlántico-Esteve-Hacienda-Hospital
 L 12 Alcázar-C. Salud San Telmo-El Portal/Guadabajaque
 L 13 Alcázar-Blas Infante-Asisa
 L 14 Esteve-Villas Este-La Marquesa
 L 16 Casinos-Hipercor-Ortega Y Gasset
 L 19 Nueva Jarilla-Guadalcacín-Angustias
 L 20 Rotonda-García Lorca-Guadalcacín

Intercity buses
From Jerez are made regular trips to the following towns:

Roads

Bicycle
Jerez has  of bike lanes that follow the main avenues of the city.

Demographics
According to official population data from INE, the municipality of Jerez had 213,105 inhabitants as of January 1, 2020. This makes Jerez the most populous city in the province, fifth in Andalusia, and 25th in Spain.

Growth

Growth of the population of Jerez de la Frontera from 1842

Fuente: INE

Population distribution

Immigration

People

 Manuel Alejandro
 Mercedes Chilla
 Daniel Güiza
 Kiko
 Lola Flores
 José Mercé
 Álvar Núñez Cabeza de Vaca
 Gerardo Núñez
 Juan José Palomino Jiménez
 Miguel Primo de Rivera
 Mala Rodriguez
 Luis Coloma, creator of Ratoncito Pérez
 José Manuel Caballero Bonald
 Juan José Padilla
 Rafael de Paula
 Pilar Paz Pasamar
 Marina Garcia Herrera
 Carlos González Ragel

International relations

Twin towns – Sister cities
Jerez de la Frontera is twinned with:

  Arles, France (29 July 1980)
  Tequila, Mexico (27 April 1982)
  Bristol, United Kingdom (2 December 1986)
  Cognac, France (16 September 1989)
  Kiyosu, Japan (19 January 1994)
  Biarritz, France (21 March 1997)
  Ciudad Juárez, Mexico (30 January 1998)
  Foz do Iguaçu, Brazil (30 January 1998)
  Zacatecas, Mexico (28 June 2005)
  Pisco, Peru (29 November 2095)
  Moquegua, Peru (29 November 2005)
  El Paso, United States

See also 

 List of mayors of Jerez de la Frontera
 Monument to Primo de Rivera (Jerez)

References

Bibliography

External links
 
 
  
  Jerez de la Frontera airport]
 Jerez News, social digital newspaper
 Jerez eGuide
 Jerez.TV, tourism and videos from Jerez de la Frontera
 City guide for Jerez
 Andalucia Events
 Jerez from Seville

 
Municipalities of the Province of Cádiz
Articles containing video clips